Val is a municipality and village in Rychnov nad Kněžnou District in the Hradec Králové Region of the Czech Republic. It has about 300 inhabitants.

Administrative parts
The village of Provoz is an administrative part of Val.

References

Villages in Rychnov nad Kněžnou District